Mera Pati Sirf Mera Hai is a 1990 Indian Hindi-language drama film, produced by Nitin Kapoor and directed by Manobala. The film stars Jeetendra, Rekha and Raadhika, with music composed by Anand–Milind. It is a remake of Manobala's Tamil film En Purushanthaan Enakku Mattumthaan (1989).

Plot 
Prakash Chandra is a proprietor of a textile showroom. He is distressed with his virago wife Roopa who fails to respect her husband and is hard-hearted towards his daughter Pinky. However, Prakash condones her, for the felicity of his sister Jyoti as Roopa is the sibling of her husband Deepak. Meanwhile, Prakash is surprised to see Sharda a bank officer as his neighbour and recollects the past. Prakash is a platform tailor before, but after the arrival of Sharda, his life takes a U-turn, and becomes a famous designer with her heartening and backing. Further, they silently love each other. During that time, Prakash finds that Jyoti is pregnant by Deepak who approves the match provided Prakash knits Roopa which he does so. Being aware of it, Roopa spreads a veil of rumours. As a result, Sharda is mortified. Thus, Sharda decides to teach her a lesson, shifts into their house, and starts teasing her along with Prakash. Annoyed, Roopa whisks with roguish Gulshan a man that holds a rivalry with Sharda, and abducts Pinky. Then, she arraigns Sharda but Advocate Shankar Dayal Sharma elder brother of Sharda proves Roopa as the convict. Moreover, she is betrayed by Gulshan and Prakash rescues Pinky. Until Roopa realises her mistake Prakash is going to marry Sharda. Immediately, she rushes, repents, and pleads pardon. At last, Sharda closes her drama and moves on. Finally, the movie ends on a happy note with the reunion of Prakash & Roopa.

Cast 

 Jeetendra as Prakash Chandra
 Rekha as Sharda Sharma
 Raadhika as Roopa Chandra
 Anupam Kher as Advocate Shankar Dayal Sharma
 Utpal Dutt as Manoharlal Verma
 Shubha Khote as Putlibai Verma
 Seema Deo as Mrs. Chandra
 Mahavir Shah as Prakash Verma
 Gulshan Grover as Gulshan
 Satish Shah as Daya Bhai
 Pradeep Rawat as Gangaram
 Yunus Parvez as Public Prosecutor
 Guddi Maruti as Guddi
 Vikas Anand as Police Inspector
 Chandrashekhar as Sharda's Prospective Father-In-Law
Brijendra Kala as Milkman

Soundtrack

References

External links 
 

Hindi remakes of Tamil films
1990s Hindi-language films
Indian drama films
Films scored by Anand–Milind
1990 drama films
1990 films
Hindi-language drama films